Pencil Brook is a small watercourse in High Crompton in the Metropolitan Borough of Oldham, Greater Manchester, and is a tributary of the River Beal.

Gallery

References
http://www.dunwoodpark.com/images/History/historygallery.htm

Rivers of the Metropolitan Borough of Oldham
2